Eucalyptus canaliculata, commonly known as grey gum, is a tree endemic to a small area in New South Wales in eastern Australia. It has smooth, mostly grey bark, lance-shaped to curved adult leaves, flower buds in groups of seven, white flowers and conical or hemispherical fruit.

Description
It has smooth, mainly grey bark with patched of brown or pink and becomes granular with age. Flowering has been observed in February and the flowers are white. The valves of the fruit extend well beyond the rim.

Taxonomy and naming
Eucalyptus canaliculata was first formally described in 1921 by Joseph Maiden from a specimen near Dungog and the description was published in the Journal and Proceedings of the Royal Society of New South Wales. The specific epithet (canaliculatum) is a Latin word meaning "grooved", but the reason Maiden used this name is obscure.

Distribution and habitat
Grey gum usually grows open forest in sites of medium to low fertility such as on dry ridge tops. It occurs in the foothills of coastal ranges near Dungog, Gloucester and Barrington Tops.

References

canaliculata
Myrtales of Australia
Flora of New South Wales
Trees of Australia
Plants described in 1921
Taxa named by Joseph Maiden